Qanat ol Bashar (also Romanized as Qanāt ol Bashar; also known as Kamshīr) is a village in Sarbanan Rural District, in the Central District of Zarand County, Kerman Province, Iran. At the 2006 census, its population was 126, in 32 families.

References 

Populated places in Zarand County